Everett Lee Peck (October 9, 1950 – June 14, 2022) was an American illustrator, cartoonist, and animator. He is best known as the creator of Duckman and Squirrel Boy.

Early life
Everett Lee Peck was born in San Diego, California, on October 9, 1950,  and later earned a degree in illustration at California State University. He then took over the illustration program at the Otis College of Art and Design in 1984.

Career
Peck's drawings have appeared in The New Yorker, Playboy, and Time, as well as numerous books, comics and movie posters. He participated in gallery shows in Tokyo, Los Angeles, New York City, and Washington, D.C., and wrote animated cartoons for Rugrats, The Critic, and a series based on one of his own cartoon characters: Duckman. 

Originally created as a comic book that was first published by Dark Horse in 1990, Duckman was turned into an animated series in 1994 for the USA Network. During its four-year run, it won the CableACE Award, and was nominated for four Emmy Awards.

At the same time, various comic books were published by Topps Comics based on the TV series. These were largely written and drawn by others, including Jay Lynch, Scott Shaw! and Craig Yoe. Topps also reprinted Peck's original 1990 Duckman comic.

Peck also created the Cartoon Network series Squirrel Boy, which ran from 2006 to 2007.

Other work by Peck included character design for four animated TV series from Sony Pictures, Jumanji, Extreme Ghostbusters, Men in Black: The Series, and Godzilla: The Series, a slew of print ads for Nike and Honda, as well as a promotional comic strip for Pizza Hut and several station IDs for UPN.

Samples of Peck's personal sketches appear in the book It's Not My Fault, a companion piece to his 2011 solo exhibition at the Oceanside Museum of Art.

Personal life and death 
At the time of his death, he resided in Oceanside, California, with his wife Helen Vita.

Peck died on June 14, 2022, and his death was announced two days afterwards via his Instagram page. His wife stated that he had died from a long battle with pancreatic cancer. Peck is survived by his wife, two children and a granddaughter. He was 71.

References

External links
 Official site
 Lambiek Comiclopedia article.
 
 

1950 births
2022 deaths
American animators
American comics artists
American cartoonists
American satirists
American television directors
American animated film directors
People from Oceanside, California
Artists from San Diego
Cartoon Network Studios people
Deaths from pancreatic cancer
Deaths from cancer in California
California State University, Long Beach alumni